Model is an abandoned unincorporated village in Las Animas County, Colorado, United States.  The Model Post Office serving ZIP Code 81059  was in operation from 1912 to 2021, and was the last business or service standing there for many years. The community originally was a planned, or "model" community, hence the name.

Geography
Model is located at  (37.372886,-104.245319).

References

Unincorporated communities in Las Animas County, Colorado
Unincorporated communities in Colorado